The office of Vice-President of the Navajo Nation was created in 1991 following restructuring of the Navajo Nation government. The president and vice president are elected every four years. The Navajo Nation Vice-President shall serve no more than two terms. 

In 2010, Ben Shelly became the first vice president to be elected president of the Navajo Nation.

In 2022, Richelle Montoya was the first woman to be elected into the Executive Branch of the Navajo Nation.

Office holders

See also 

 President of the Navajo Nation
 Speaker of the Navajo Nation Council
 The Navajo Nation Council
 Navajo Nation presidential election, 2006
 Navajo Nation presidential election, 2010
 Navajo Nation presidential election, 2015
 Navajo Nation presidential election, 2018
 Navajo Nation presidential election, 2022

References

Navajo Nation politicians